"Body Bounce" is a hip-hop single by Canadian rapper Kardinal Offishall featuring Akon. Produced by Haze, it was released on iTunes on April 9, 2010. In September 2010, the single was certified Gold by the CRIA.

Chart performance
The song debuted on the Canadian Hot 100 at #70, it peaked at #16.

Charts and certifications

Chart positions

Year-end charts

Certifications

References

2010 singles
Akon songs
Kardinal Offishall songs
Songs written by Akon
2009 songs
Songs written by Kardinal Offishall
Geffen Records singles